A horseshoe moustache, also known as a biker moustache, is a full moustache with vertical extensions grown on the corners of the lips and down the sides of the mouth to the jawline, resembling an upside-down U or a horseshoe. The whiskers grown along the sides of the mouth in the horseshoe are sometimes referred to as "pipes".

The horseshoe is not to be confused with the Fu Manchu, which is grown only from the upper lip while the sides remain shaven.

Gallery

See also 
 List of moustache styles
 List of facial hairstyles

References

External links
 

Moustache styles